Robinson 77, formerly SIA Building, is a high-rise skyscraper located in the central business district of Singapore. The building is located on 77 Robinson Road, just next to DBS Building Tower One and Two. The SIA Building was the flagship building for Singapore Airlines. The airline head office is not located in this building; it is and has been located at Airline House in Changi.

It has a total of 180 car park lots.

History 
SIA Building was designed by Obayashi Gumi Corporation, and SAA Partnership, and structural engineering of the development was done by T. Y. Lin International. Construction of the building was completed in 1998. Other firms involved in the development included Singapore Airlines, PCR Engineers Private Limited, PCR Engineers Private Limited, Rider Hunt Levett & Bailey, Levett & Bailey Chart, and Quantity Surveyors Ltd.

Architecture 

The SIA Building was one of the first high-rises in Singapore with its exterior made out of glass. As the flagship building for Singapore Airlines, it bears the Singapore Airlines' logo. The roof of the building also incorporates a vertical stabilizer design, similar to that of an airplane.

Selling of building 
In 2006, Singapore Airlines sold the SIA Building to TSO Investment, which is a unit of a real estate fund managed by CLSA Capital Partners. It comes at a price of S$343.9 million, which amounts to some $1,165 dollars per square foot. According to the company, the sale was "in line with the non-core business strategy". It was valued at $118.8 million then. SIA subsequently used proceeds from the sale for investment and growing the company and its subsidiaries.

In 2011 SEB Investment announced the company would be selling the building.

In 2015 it was announced again that SEB Investment would be selling the building, but the disposition plan was subsequently cancelled as the company was undergoing a change of ownership and management. The property is currently held by Savills Fund Management (which was previously known as SEB Investment GmbH) 
The property was sold in 2016 back to a fund managed by CLSA. CLSA, who refurbished parts of the building during 2017 and 2018 intends to sell it on in late 2018.

See also 

 Singapore Airlines
 List of tallest buildings in Singapore

References

External links 
 Singapore Airlines homepage

Office buildings completed in 1998
Raffles Place
Skyscraper office buildings in Singapore
Downtown Core (Singapore)
Singapore Airlines
20th-century architecture in Singapore